James Harris (born September 18, 1991) is an American sprinter who specialises in the 400 metres. He was part of the US team that won gold in the  relay at the 2013 World Championships in Athletics.

External links 

 

1991 births
Living people
American male sprinters
Pan American Games medalists in athletics (track and field)
Pan American Games bronze medalists for the United States
Athletes (track and field) at the 2015 Pan American Games
World Athletics Championships winners
Medalists at the 2015 Pan American Games